Toastmaster may refer to:

 Toastmaster, a role at public speaking events
 A member of Toastmasters International
 Toastmaster (magazine), the official publication of Toastmasters International
 Toastmaster (appliances), a brand of toasters and other small kitchen appliances